Badamestan-e Pain may refer to:
 Badamestan-e Pain, Kerman
 Badamestan-e Pain, Kohgiluyeh and Boyer-Ahmad